The Church of the Nazarene in Trinidad and Tobago is a part of the international Church of the Nazarene.

History
The Christian denomination entered Trinidad and Tobago in 1926 by sending USA missionary couple James and Nora Hill and Barbados missionary Carlotta Urchilla Graham.  Their labor culminated in the incorporation of the Church of the Nazarene in Trinidad and Tobago by Act of Parliament in 1974. The story of the growth of the Church of the Nazarene in Trinidad and Tobago is recorded in the book, A History of the Church of the Nazarene in Trinidad and Tobago by Dr. Gelien Matthews.  In 2013, the Church of the Nazarene in Trinidad and Tobago has approximately 4,000 members in 31 congregations, and is part of the Mesoamerica Region of the International Church of the Nazarene.

The growth of the Church of the Nazarene in Trinidad and Tobago has also been tied to the establishment of a Nazarene College (NTC then CNTC and now CNC) in Trinidad.  This story has been vividly captured in the book, Triumph in Trinidad-God's Promises never failed by USA missionary Dr. Ruth O. Saxon, who served as Professor, Academic Dean, and President in her forty-three years at the College, and as a Supply Pastor to a number of Local churches.

The Church of the Nazarene in Trinidad and Tobago is led by the ministry of the District Superintendent. In the early years the church was led by American District Superintendents Raymond Miller (1949–55), Prescott Beals (1955-57), Wesley Harmon (1958–63), and William Fowler (1963–71).  The first Local District Superintendent was Hugh Mc Kenzie (1971–75).  He was followed by nationals Farrell Chapman (1975–83), Carl Bompart (1983-86), Clifford Manswell (1986-2006).

The Church of the Nazarene in Trinidad and Tobago is currently led by District Superintendent, the Rev. Dr. Victor Everton George, who assumed this ministry in 2006.

References

Further reading
A Love Story from Trinidad by Dr. Ruth O. Saxon 
Flares in the Night by Dr. Ruth O. Saxon

External links

Church of the Nazarene Congregations in Trinidad & Tobago 
Arima Church of the Nazarene
Bethany Church of the Nazarene
Canaan Church of the Nazarene
Cochrane Church of the Nazarene
Cocorite Church of the Nazarene
Couva Church of the Nazarene		
Cumuto Church of the Nazarene
D’abadie Church of the Nazarene
Dibe Church of the Nazarene
El Bethel Church of the Nazarene	
El Socorro Church of the Nazarene
Felicity Church of the Nazarene	
Five Rivers Church of the Nazarene
Gonzales Church of the Nazarene	
Guanapo Church of the Nazarene
Laventille Church of the Nazarene	
La Platta Church of the Nazarene
Nazarene Holiness Center		
Nazarene Worship Centre
Nazarene Victory Chapel
Petit Valley Church of the Nazarene
Piarco Church of the Nazarene		
Pt. Fortin Church of the Nazarene
San Fernando Church of the Nazarene 	
Sangre Grande Church of the Nazarene
Santa Cruz Church of the Nazarene 	
St. James Church of the Nazarene	
Tunapuna Church of the Nazarene	
Valencia Church of the Nazarene	
Vance River Church of the Nazarene	
Vega de Oropouche Church of the Nazarene

Churches in Trinidad and Tobago
Trinidad and Tobago
Evangelical denominations in North America